The 2007 NCAA Division I Football Championship Game was a postseason college football game between the Appalachian State Mountaineers and the Delaware Fightin' Blue Hens. It was played on December 14, 2007, at Finley Stadium, home field of the University of Tennessee at Chattanooga. The culminating game of the 2007 NCAA Division I FCS football season, it was won by Appalachian State, 49–21.

Teams
The participants of the Championship Game were the finalists of the 2007 FCS Playoffs, which began with a 16-team bracket.

Appalachian State Mountaineers

Appalachian State's first game of the 2007 season was a 34–32 upset win over Michigan, who were the No. 5 ranked team in FBS at the time. Appalachian State went on to finish their regular season with a 9–2 record (5–2 in conference). The Mountaineers defeated James Madison, Eastern Washington, and Richmond to reach the final. This was Appalachian State's third consecutive appearance in the championship game, having won the title in both 2005 and 2006.

Delaware Fightin' Blue Hens

Delaware finished their regular season with an 8–3 record (5–3 in conference). The Fightin' Blue Hens defeated Delaware State, top-seed Northern Iowa, and fourth-seed Southern Illinois to reach the final.

Game summary

Scoring summary

Game statistics

References

Further reading

External links
 Box score at ESPN
 Detailed box score at caasports.com
 2007 FCS Championship - Appalachian State vs. Delaware via YouTube

Championship Game
NCAA Division I Football Championship Games
Appalachian State Mountaineers football games
Delaware Fightin' Blue Hens football games
College football in Tennessee
American football competitions in Chattanooga, Tennessee
NCAA Division I Football Championship Game
NCAA Division I Football Championship Game